is a 1956 Japanese drama film directed by Mikio Naruse. It is based on the novel Nagareru by Aya Kōda.

Plot
Widow Rika starts working as a maid in the okiya (geisha lodging house) of geisha Otsuta, who lives with her daughter Katsuyo, her younger sister Yoneko and Yoneko's child, and geisha Nanako. Of the seven geisha who once worked for Otsuta, only Nanako and Someka are left; a third girl, Namie, has just run away, convinced that she has been tricked out of her share. Otsuta's older sister Otoyo tries to pressure Otsuta into finding a financially secured husband to pay back the loans on the house which the two of them mortgaged together. Ohama, a former geisha sister of Otsuta, tries to help by making contact between her and her nephew's employer Hanayama, a former patron of Otsuta. The situation tightens when Namie's uncle shows up, demanding the money which he thinks his niece is entitled to. Otsuta tries to compensate him with 50,000 yen, half of Hanayama's onetime donation, but he refuses and goes to the police instead, resulting in the questioning of Otsuta and Katsuyo. Eventually Ohama pays for Otsuta's mortgaged house, but only to move the Tsuta House out and open her own restaurant instead. She offers Rika an employment in her future business, but Rika declines. In the final scene, Rika, instructed not to tell anyone of Ohama's plans, watches the unknowing Otsuta giving music lessons to apprentices.

Cast
 Kinuyo Tanaka as Rika, called Oharu
 Isuzu Yamada as Otsuta
 Hideko Takamine as Katsuyo, Otsuta's daughter
 Mariko Okada as Nanako
 Haruko Sugimura as Someka
 Sumiko Kurishima as Ohama
 Chieko Nakakita as Yoneko, Otsuta's younger sister
 Natsuko Kahara as Otoyo, Otsuta's older sister
 Seiji Miyaguchi as Namie's uncle
 Daisuke Katō as Yoneko's ex-husband
 Chiyo Izumi as Namie
 Nobuo Nakamura as doctor
 Noboru Nakaya as Saeki, Ohama's nephew

Book and film
Aya Kōda's novel, which had been published one year prior to the film's release, described the events mainly from the perspective of Rika/Oharu, an educated woman, other than the rather simple character portrayed by Kinuyo Tanaka in the film. Also, the film enlarged the role of Katsuyo, thereby presenting two outside views onto the geisha milieu. Again, the ending differs in book and film: In the book, Rika accepts the offer to manage Otsatu's former house once the women have been removed.

For her book, Kōda had used her own experiences she had made while working as a maid in a geisha house in Tokyo's Yanagibashi district in the early 1950s.

Release
Flowing was released in Japan on 20 November 1956. An English subtitle version was released in the United States on 13 May 1978 and again on 29 November 1985.

Awards
Isuzu Yamada received the 1956 Blue Ribbon Award for Best Actress and the 1956 Mainichi Film Concours For Best Actress for Flowing, A Cat, Shozo, and Two Women and Boshizō, and the 1956 Kinema Junpo Award for Best Actress for Flowing and A Cat, Shozo, and Two Women.

References

External links
 

1956 films
1956 drama films
Japanese drama films
1950s Japanese-language films
Japanese black-and-white films
Films based on Japanese novels
Films directed by Mikio Naruse
Toho films
Films produced by Sanezumi Fujimoto
Films scored by Ichirō Saitō
1950s Japanese films